Puerto Rico Highway 438 (PR-438) is a rural road located entirely in the municipality of San Sebastián, Puerto Rico.

Major intersections

See also

 List of highways numbered 438

References

External links
 

438
San Sebastián, Puerto Rico